Greenland is divided into five municipalities  Avannaata, Kujalleq, Qeqertalik, Qeqqata, and Sermersooq  as well as the large Northeast Greenland National Park which is unincorporated. The Thule Air Base is administered by the United States Air Force and operates as an unincorporated enclave surrounded by territory of Avannaata.

Municipalities

History 
Greenland was originally divided between the two colonies of North Greenland with its capital at Qeqertarsuaq (formerly Godhavn) and South Greenland with its capital at Nuuk (formerly Godthaab). These were directed by inspectors until 1924, when the officials were promoted to governors. The colonies were united in 1940 and the administration centralized at Godthaab.

In 1953 a new Danish constitution promoted Greenland to full membership in the Danish state with all of its inhabitants given Danish citizenship.

Divisions and national park 
For statistical and some regulatory purposes the country was divided into three divisions (landsdele) in 1951: West Greenland, North Greenland and East Greenland. The large Northeast Greenland National Park was established in 1974 encompassing the northern part of East Greenland and amended with the eastern part of North Greenland in 1988.

With the advent of Home Rule in 1979, these names were Greenlandicized to Kitaa, Tunu, and Avannaa. By 2008, Kitaa had 15 municipalities, Tunu 2, and Avannaa 1.

Municipalities 
In 1908 Greenland was divided into 63 municipalities with elected municipal councils. After the modernization phase started in the 1950s these were consolidated and by 1979 there were 18 municipalities.

The structural reform in 2008-09 created 4 enlarged municipalities.  Of these the largest, Qaasuitsup Kommunia, was partitioned on 1 January 2018 to form the new municipalities of Avannaata and Qeqertalik.

Kitaa (West Greenland) 

Southern part:
Nanortalik Municipality
Qaqortoq Municipality
Narsaq Municipality
Ivittuut Municipality
Paamiut Municipality
Central part:
Nuuk Municipality
Maniitsoq Municipality
Sisimiut Municipality
Kangaatsiaq Municipality
Aasiaat Municipality
Qasigiannguit Municipality
Ilulissat Municipality
Qeqertarsuaq Municipality
Northern part:
Uummannaq Municipality
Upernavik Municipality

Tunu (East Greenland) 
Ammassalik Municipality
Ittoqqortoormiit Municipality 
Northeast Greenland National Park (southern part) (unincorporated)

Avannaa (North Greenland) 
Qaanaaq Municipality
Thule Air Base (Pituffik) (unincorporated)

See also

KANUKOKA, the municipalities' leadership council
Subdivisions of the Nordic countries
ISO 3166-2:GL
ISO 3166-2:DK

References

  

Greenland
 
Greenland
Greenland